Serenay Aktaş (born 1 October 1993) is a Turkish former women's football forward, and television series and film actress.

Serenay Aktaş was born in the Bakırköy district of Istanbul, Turkey on 1 October 1993.

Sports career
She obtained her football license from Zeytinburnuspor on 9 October 2007. She began to play for Zeytinburnuspor in the 2008–09 Women's First League.  The next season, her team was relegated to the Second League. In the beginning of the 2010–11 season, she stayed far from the field. In the beginning of the second half of that season, she moved to Fatih Vatan Spor to play in the Women's Regional League. She enjoyed her team's promotion to the Second League at the end of the 2010–11 season. In the 2012–13 Women's Second League season, she transferred to 1207 Antalya Spor. She left her club in Antalya after the first half of the 2014–15 Second League season, and returned to Istanbul and signed with then Third League-club Beşiktaş J.K. However, her contract was annulled due to her participation in the reality show Survivor Turkey as a competitor. She was capped in a total of 54 games and scored 35 goals in her career.

Career statistics
.

Acting career

Television series
In addition to her football career, she starred in a number of television series. She appeared for the first time in Kanıt (2010–2013). She had then guest appearances in television series like Türk Malı (2010), Yahşi Cazibe (2010), Kalbim Seni Seçti (2011–2012) and Alemin Kralı (2011–2013). Her main role was the character "Gülüm" in Arka Sıradakiler (2007–2011). The next year, she played the character "Ayşe Hatun" in one season of Muhteşem Yüzyıl (2013–2014). Her following roles included Acil Aşk Aranıyor  (2015) and Gulumse yeter (2016).

Movies
Aktaş appeared in the movie Çılgın Dersane 3 (2014). She then became the starring character in the movie Figüran (2015),Yıldızlar da Kayar: Das Borak ("Stars Fall Too: Das Borak") (2016).

Reality show
In 2014, she participated in the celebrities team at Survivor Turkey – Celebrities vs Volunteers, where she was eliminated after 91 days. And in 2015, she competed in Survivor Turkey – All Star.

Filmography

References

External links

Living people
1993 births
People from Bakırköy
Footballers from Istanbul
Actresses from Istanbul
Women's association football forwards
Turkish women's footballers
Fatih Vatan Spor players
1207 Antalya Spor players
Turkish television actresses
Turkish film actresses
Survivor Turkey contestants